Churchuri (also Romanized as Chūrchūrī) is a village in Qushkhaneh-ye Pain Rural District, Qushkhaneh District, Shirvan County, North Khorasan Province, Iran. At the 2006 census, its population was 417, in 74 families.

References 

Populated places in Shirvan County